The Roman Catholic Diocese of Sokodé is a diocese located in the city of Sokodé in the Ecclesiastical province of Lomé in Togo.

History
 May 18, 1937: Established as Apostolic Prefecture of Sokodé from the Apostolic Vicariate of Togo
 September 14, 1955: Promoted as Diocese of Sokodé

Special churches
The Cathedral is the Cathédrale Sainte Thérèse in Sokodé.

Bishops

Ordinaries
 Prefects Apostolic of Sokodé (Roman rite)
 Fr. Joseph-Paul Strebler, S.M.A. (1937.05 – 1945.11.08), appointed Vicar Apostolic of Lomé; future Archbishop
 Fr. Jérôme-Théodore Lingenheim, S.M.A. (1946.06.07 – 1955.09.14 see below)
 Bishops of Sokodé (Roman rite)
 Bishop Jérôme-Théodore Lingenheim, S.M.A. (-see above 1955.09.14 – 1964.11.18)
 Bishop Chrétien Matawo Bakpessi (1965.08.09 – 1992.04.27)
 Bishop Ambroise Kotamba Djoliba (1993.04.05 - 2016.01.03)
 Bishop Celestin-Marie Gaoua (2016.01.03 - )

Other priest of this diocese who became bishop
Jacques Danka Longa (priest here, 1992-1994), appointed Coadjutor Bishop of Kara in 2008

See also
Roman Catholicism in Togo

Sources
 GCatholic.org
 Catholic Hierarchy

Sokode
Sokode
Christian organizations established in 1937
Roman Catholic dioceses and prelatures established in the 20th century
1937 establishments in French Togoland